Dr. G.W. Williams Secondary School is one of five high schools in Aurora, Ontario and is one of two under the jurisdiction of the York Region District School Board.  In 2005, there were approximately 1350 students from Grades 9 to 12. In the 2017–2018 school year, enrollment was approximately 750 students.

History
The school started in 1888 as Aurora High School on the top floor of the Aurora Public School located at 22 Church Street. In 1892 they moved into a new purpose built building on Wells Street that would later become the Wells Street Public School after the High School moved to their current location on Dunning Avenue in 1952.  Additions were placed on the Dunning Avenue school in 1956, 1967, and 1998. In 1961 the school was renamed The Dr. G. W. Williams Secondary School in honour of Dr. David Garnet Wolsley Williams, a local medical doctor and former trustee of the school board. G.W. Williams is one of the YRDSB's International Baccalaureate candidate schools.

Replacement school
The new school is planned to open in 2023.

Notable alumni
Brian Stemmle - Canadian Alpine Ski Team
Garth Gibson -  Proposed the redundant array of independent disks (RAID) concept along with David Patterson and Randy Katz
Matthew Ko - First Mr. Hong Kong winner in 2005 and TVB male artist.

See also
List of high schools in Ontario

References

External links
Dr. G. W. Williams Secondary School

York Region District School Board
Educational institutions established in 1888
High schools in the Regional Municipality of York
Education in Aurora, Ontario
1888 establishments in Ontario